The Gubik Formation is a geologic formation in Alaska. It preserves fossils.

See also

 List of fossiliferous stratigraphic units in Alaska
 Paleontology in Alaska

References
 

Geologic formations of Alaska